Sköld Yngve Johnson (3 August 1895 – 3 July 1949) was a Swedish diver who competed in the 1920 Summer Olympics. He was born in Västra Ed, Kalmar Municipality and died in Eskilstuna. In 1920 he finished fifth the 10 metre platform event.

References

External links
profile

1895 births
1949 deaths
Swedish male divers
Olympic divers of Sweden
Divers at the 1920 Summer Olympics
People from Kalmar Municipality
Sportspeople from Kalmar County